Paradise Lost is an opera in two acts with music by Krzysztof Penderecki and an English libretto by Christopher Fry.  The opera is based on the 1667 epic poem of the same name by Milton.  Penderecki himself characterized the work as a Sacra Rappresentazione (sacred representation) rather than an opera.  He wrote the opera on commission for the 1976 US Bicentennial celebrations.  The first performance was given on 29 November 1978, at the Lyric Opera of Chicago.  The same production was given at La Scala, Milan on 31 January 1979.

The opera is set in heaven, hell, and on earth at the dawn of creation, and is divided into 42 scenes.

Roles

References

Further reading
Humphrey, Mary Lou (January 1979). "Paradise Lost: Penderecki's Operatic Enigma." Music Journal, vol. 37, no. 1, pp. 11-13. 

1978 operas
English-language operas
Operas by Krzysztof Penderecki
Operas
Cultural depictions of Adam and Eve
The Devil in opera